was a Japanese photographer noted for a strikingly modern approach to pictorialism.

His three eldest brothers died young, but another older brother, Shinzō, would also win great fame as a photographer and the last, Nobuyoshi (信義, b.1897) would win some fame too, under the name .

Fukuhara studied French at Keio University (Tokyo) from 1911 to 1917. His photographic activities were amateur but rigorous; his photographs employed both shallow focus and rather incongruous juxtapositions to great effect. Half of a photograph by Fukuhara might be taken up by corrugated metal fencing.

Fukuhara died on 29 September 1946 in Nagano.

Notes

Books showing Fukuhara's works

 Fukuhara Shinzō, Fukuhara Rosō: Hikari to sono kaichō (福原信三　福原路草：光とその諧調, Shinzō Fukuhara, Rosō Fukuhara: Light and its harmony). Nikon Salon Books 3. Tokyo: Nikkor Club, 1977.  
 Fukuhara Shinzō to Fukuhara Rosō (福原信三と福原路草, Shinzō Fukuhara and Rosō Fukuhara). Nihon no Shashinka 3. Tokyo: Iwanami, 1997. .
Hikari no shijō: Fukuhara Shinzō no sekai (光の詩情：福原信三の世界) / The World of Shinzo Fukuhara: Poetics of Light. Tokyo: Shiseido Corporate Culture Department, 1994.  
Hikari to sono kaichō: Fukuhara Shinzō, Fukuhara Rosō: 1913-nen – 1941-nen (光とその諧調：福原信三・福原路草：1913年–1941年) / The Light with Its Harmony: Shinzo Fukuhara / Roso Fukuhara: Photographs 1913–1941. Tokyo: Watari-um, 1992. .
 Iizawa, Kohtaro, and Hervé Chandès. Shinzo et Roso Fukuhara. Paris: Fondation Cartier pour l'art contemporain, 1994. .

Other sources

 Tokyo Metropolitan Museum of Photography, editor. . Kyoto: Tankōsha, 2000.

External links 

 Shinzō and Rosō Fukuhara at Shiseido. A large collection of their photographs, and some other materials.

1892 births
1946 deaths
Japanese photographers
People from Tokyo